Oslo City is one of the largest shopping centres in central Oslo, Norway.
The shopping centre was built in 1988, and is visited by c. 50,000 people a day – 16 million a year. It generated gross revenues of 1,444 billion Norwegian kroner in 2005. It has 26,000 m² of commercial space, with 93 stores on five floors.

References

External links
Official website, in Norwegian

Shopping centres in Oslo
1988 establishments in Norway
Shopping malls established in 1988